The FIS Nordic Junior World Ski Championships 2004 took place in Stryn, Norway from 3 February to 8 February 2004. It was the 27th Junior World Championships in nordic skiing.

Schedule
All times are in Central European Time (CET).

Cross-country

Nordic combined

Ski jumping

Medal summary

Junior events

Cross-country skiing

Nordic Combined

Ski jumping

Medal table

References 

2004
2004 in cross-country skiing
2004 in ski jumping
Junior World Ski Championships
2004 in youth sport
International sports competitions hosted by Norway